The Barb or Berber horse (Berber: Ayis Amaziɣ, ⴰⵢⵢⵙ ⴰⵎⴰⵣⵉⴳ) is a North African breed of riding horse with great hardiness and stamina. It is closely associated with the Berber or Amazigh peoples of the Maghreb. It has influenced a number of modern breeds, including many in northern and western Africa.

History 

When imported to Europe, the Barbs were sometimes mistaken for Arabians, although they have distinctly different physical characteristics. The Europeans saw that their size was similar and their handlers were Berber Muslims who spoke Arabic. An example of such confusion is that the Godolphin Arabian, one of the foundation sires of the Thoroughbred, was an Arabian stallion but, due to his Tunisian origins, was referred to as the "Godolphin Barb."

The Barb is now bred primarily in Morocco, Algeria, Spain and southern France. Due to difficult economic times in North Africa, the number of purebred Barbs is decreasing. The World Organization of the Barb Horse, founded in Algeria in 1987, was formed to promote and preserve the breed. In 2014, the International Equestrian Federation recognized the Barb horse as their Horse of Honor at the World Equestrian Games in Normandy.

Influence on other breeds 

The Barb may have had more influence on the racing breeds throughout the world than any other horse except the Arabian. Berber invaders from North Africa took their horses, the forerunners of today's Barbs, to Europe from the early eighth century onwards. Once established with settlers on the Iberian peninsula, the Barb horse was bred with Spanish stock under 300 years of Umayyad patronage to develop the Andalusian (and the Lusitano). The Andalusian was highly prized and it was used for major development stock in horse breeding all over the world.

Historical references to "Barbary" horses include Roan Barbary, owned by King Richard II of England in the 14th century. The Barb horses were valued by other Europeans, including the Italians, whose noble families established large racing stables. During the 16th century, Henry VIII purchased a number of Barbary horses from Federico Gonzaga of Mantua, importing seven mares and a stallion. He continued to buy other Barbs and Andalusians. After the Royal Stables were sold off under Cromwell, private owners in England continued to value the Barbs and used them to develop the Thoroughbred. The influence of the Barb is also evident in the Argentinian Criollo, the Paso Fino, and many other Western Hemisphere breeds, including the American Quarter Horse, the Mustang and the Appaloosa.

Despite its importance as a progenitor of other breeds, the Barb is less renowned than the Arab, possibly because it was considered a less attractive-looking breed.  In other important qualities, the Barb has the same stamina and endurance, the same ability to thrive on meager rations, and the same sure-footedness and speed over short distances. The Barb also was valued for its "strong, short-coupled body, perfect for collection— the posture that makes weight-bearing easiest for the horse—its eagerness to learn and its gentle nature." Because of these characteristics, beginning in the 16th century, the horses were also trained for dressage, in Paris and other European capitals. Sixteenth-century and later portraits of royalty on horses frequently portrayed the latter in dressage positions.

See also 
 Andalusian horse
 Arabian horse
 Equine coat color genetics
 Spanish-Norman horse
 Spanish Barb

References

External links 

Horse breeds
North Africa
North African culture